Sergei Ivanovich Lapshin (born 17 October 1974) is a Russian football coach and a former player.

Career
A product of FC Spartak Moscow's youth football academy, Lapshin joined Russian Premier League side FC Krylia Sovetov Samara on loan after impressing for FC Khimki during 1998. He joined Premier League rivals FC Chernomorets Novorossiysk during the next season.

Lapshin played in the Russian First Division with FC Amkar Perm during the 2000 and 2001 seasons. He also played in the Russian Second Division with FC Khimki during the 1998 and 1999 seasons, with FC Kuzbass-Dynamo Kemerovo during the 2002 season, with FC Severstal Cherepovets during the 2003 season, and with FC Spartak Lukhovitsy during the 2004 season.

He was awarded the gold distinction to the All-Russian sports complex “Ready for Labor and Defense”.

References

External links
 

1974 births
Living people
Association football midfielders
FC Amkar Perm players
FC Chernomorets Novorossiysk players
FC Dynamo Moscow reserves players
FC Khimki players
PFC Krylia Sovetov Samara players
FC Sheksna Cherepovets players
FC Lukhovitsy players
Russian football managers
Russian footballers
Russian Premier League players
FC Novokuznetsk players
FC Volga Ulyanovsk players